The CMLL World Welterweight Championship (Spanish: Campeonato Mundial de Peso Welter del CMLL) is a professional wrestling world championship in the Mexican professional wrestling promotion Consejo Mundial de Lucha Libre (CMLL). As with other professional wrestling championships, it is not won or lost competitively but is instead scripted by the bookers of a wrestling promotion. The title is awarded after the chosen wrestler "wins" a match.

Overall there has been a total of 34 official championship reigns, shared between 22 different wrestlers. Titán is the current champion, having defeated Soberano Jr. in the finals of a tournament for the vacant championship. Máscara Dorada is the only wrestler to hold the championship four times. Mephisto's first reign was the longest individual reign, for 1,141 days from 2004 to 2007. The championship has been defended in Mexico and Japan, with three title changes in Japan. The championship has been vacated three times, and CMLL has held three tournaments for the championship.

History
In the late 1980s, CMLL left the National Wrestling Alliance (NWA) but retained control of the NWA World Welterweight Championship as their main championship of the welterweight division. They also promoted the Mexican National Welterweight Championship as a secondary title for the Welterweight division. In 1991 they decided to create a series of CMLL-branded world championships, one of which was for the welterweight division. They held a four-man tournament on February 15, 1992, to crown the first welterweight champion. The participants were Fuerza Guerrera, El Felino, América and El Khalifa; in the finals, Fuerza Guerrera defeated El Khalifa to become the first champion. On July 16, 1992, the Mexican National Welterweight Champion defeated CMLL Welterweight Champion América, vacating the Mexican National Welterweight Championship. In 1993 control of the Mexican National Welterweight Championship was transferred from CMLL to rival promotion Asistencia Asesoría y Administración (AAA).

In 1996 the championship was vacated after then-champion El Pantera lost the championship to Super Delfin while on tour in Japan. Pantera left CMLL for AAA after the tour, and lost a match to Super Delfin in Japan, intending to surrender the championship to him. CMLL knew that Pantera was leaving and nullified the championship change, choosing not to vacate the title rather than recognizing the title change. CMLL put together a 16-man tournament to crown a new champion, and Máscara Mágica defeated El Felino in the final to become the seventh official CMLL World Welterweight Champion. Máscara Mágica would later defeat Super Delfin to put an end to any questions about the lineage of the championship. In 1998 the Mexican National Welterweight Championship was returned to CMLL, making it a tertiary title behind the CMLL and NWA branded world championships. In 2010 CMLL returned the NWA World Welterweight Championship to the NWA but immediately replaced it with the NWA World Historic Welterweight Championship. In early 2015 then-champion Máscara Dorada signed a contract to work for New Japan Pro-Wrestling (NJPW) for a year, with CMLL allowing him to take the championship with him to Japan. During his tour of Japan Máscara Dorada lost the championship to Bushi, which was officially acknowledged by CMLL.

Reigns

In the 20th century Mexican wrestling enforced the weight divisions more strictly, but in this century the rules have occasionally been ignored for some weight divisions. While the heavyweight championship is traditionally considered the most prestigious weight division in professional wrestling, CMLL places more emphasis on the lower weight divisions. All title matches promoted in Mexico take place under best two-out-of-three falls rules, while championship matches promoted in Japan follow the local custom, decided by a single fall.

Titán is the current champion after defeating Soberano Jr. at a CMLL show in Arena Mexico on December 8, 2019 He is the 34th overall champion. Mephisto has the longest combined reigns,2,191 days, divided over two separate reigns, he also holds the record for the longest  individual reign of all champions at 1,141 days from 2004 to 2007. The first champion Fuerza Guerrera is also the person who has held the title the shortest time, 22 days, except possibly for Mascara Magica, whose second reign was shorter; no specific date for the start of the reign has been confirmed, so his reign may have been as short as 6 days.

Tournaments

1992
On February 15, 1992, CMLL held a one-night, four-man tournament to crown the first ever CMLL World Welterweight Champion. The welterweight championship was the fifth CMLL branded world championship created after the CMLL World Heavyweight, CMLL World Light Heavyweight, CMLL World Trios and CMLL World Middleweight Championship. In the tournament finals Fuerza Guerrera defeated El Khalifa to win the championship.

1996

In 1996 CMLL decided not to acknowledge that La Pantera had lost the CMLL World Welterweight Championship during a tour of Japan, declaring the title vacant instead. They held a 16-man tournament from May 7 to May 21, 1996, to crown a new champion. In the finals Máscara Mágica defeated El Felino to become the seventh champion.

2014-2015

On May 2, 2015, then-reigning CMLL World Welterweight Champion Místico crashed his motorcycle, breaking the fibula and tibia in his right leg. He had surgery the following day. Due to the injury the Welterweight championship became inactive for several months, as Místico was unable to compete. During a press conference on November 19, 2014, Místico announced that he was not ready to return to the ring, which led to the CMLL World Welterweight Championship being declared vacant. On December 26, 2014, CMLL held a 10-man Torneo cibernetico elimination match to determine the next champion. Negro Casas and Máscara Dorada outlasted the other eight competitors; Delta, Fuego, Kamaitachi, Pólvora, Rey Cometa, Sangre Azteca, Titán and Tritón. A week later Máscara Dorada defeated Negro Casas to become the 29th CMLL World Heavyweight Champion.

Torneo cibernetico order of elimination

2019

On September 27, 2019, CMLL fired then-reigning CMLL World Welterweight Champion Dragon Lee, but at the time did not mention any plans for the championship itself. It was not until November that CMLL announced their plans, as they revealed a tournament to crown a new champion that would start on December 1, 2019. The tournament started with a 12-man torneo cibernetico elimination match to determine the two finalists. The match saw Soberano Jr. and Titán outlast Audaz, Negro Casas, Drone, Fuego, Fugaz, Dulce Gardenia, Rey Cometa, Star Jr., Stigma, and Templario to qualify for the finals the following week. The following week Titán defeated Sobreano Jr. two falls to one, to become the 34th CMLL World Welterweight Champion.

Torneo cibernetico order of elimination

Footnotes

References

External links
Official CMLL Website

Consejo Mundial de Lucha Libre championships
Welterweight wrestling championships
World professional wrestling championships